St. Mary's Catholic High School (SMCHS) was established in the year 1968 by Fr. Eusebius Daveri. It is located in the city of Dubai, and is one of the oldest schools in the UAE. Affiliated with the church, the school has a very evident Catholic background.

History Of Smchs
The land on which St. Mary's Catholic High School, Dubai stands is the kind courtesy of then dynamic Ruler, His Highness Sheikh Rashid bin Saeed Al Maktoum. Under the guidance, determination and foresight of the founding father, Father Eusebius Daveri, St. Mary's Catholic School was born in 1968, in a little classroom, with 30 students and a handful of teachers. On 15 August 1968, Feast of the Assumption of Our Lady, Father Bamba, an Army Chaplain, in the presence of Father Eusebius and the community blessed the foundation stone for the school project.

In 1971, the school was recognised as a Centre for the London University GCE Examinations at Ordinary Levels.

Success in education

The school has consistently produced GCSE O-Level and A-Level results that are among the highest in Dubai. Several alumni have been accepted into universities like Harvard, MIT and the University of Oxford.

Notable alumni
Erika Endriukaityte — X Factor Lithuania 2015 Contestant

Stephanie Lohale — Miss India Worldwide 2015

Sunny Varkey — Chairman and co-founder of GEMS Education

Francis deSouza — Chief Executive Officer of Illumina

Kevin Thomas -  First South Asian and the first Indian-American to serve in the New York State Senate.

References

External links
St. Mary's Catholic High School Dubai Official Website

Schools in Dubai
Educational institutions established in 1968
Catholic schools in the United Arab Emirates